Yevgeny Fyodorovich Dragunov (February 20, 1920August 4, 1991) was a Soviet weapons designer, best known for his role in helping invent the semi-automatic rifle bearing his name, the Dragunov sniper rifle.

Early life and education
Coming from a family of gunsmiths, Dragunov worked as a factory machinist before beginning military service in 1939.

Career
After 1941, Dragunov was a senior armorer working for the Soviet Union and also captured enemy weapons during wartime. After 1945, he returned to Izhevsk and joined the Arms Design Bureau, working as a project engineer on sporting and civilian target rifles through the 1950s. One of these, the Biathlon target rifle, went on to the Olympic Gold. In 1959, Dragunov submitted his design for a military sniper rifle, the SVD, which was accepted into Soviet military service in 1963, and later became known as the Dragunov rifle.

Dragunov also participated in the competition that led to the adoption of AKS-74U with a gas-operated design called MA (malokalibernii avtomat). Although Dragunov's avtomat was comparable in performance to Kalashnikov's, the latter had the advantage that it shared some parts with the AK-74 rifle already in production. The non-metallic parts of the MA were made of polyamides. The MA was Dragunov's last major design. The trigger mechanism used in the MA was fairly similar to the one previously used in his PP-71 sub-machine gun,.

Awards 
 Order of the Badge of Honour (1957)
 the Lenin Prize (1963)
 the State Prize of the Russian Federation (1992, posthumously)

Inventions 
 TsV-50 (ЦВ-50) - target rifle
 MTsV-50 (МЦВ-50) - target rifle
 TsV-55 "Zenith" (ЦВ-55 "Зенит") - 7.62mm target rifle
 MTsV-55 "Strela" (МЦВ-55 "Стрела") - 5.6mm target rifle
 MTsV-56 "Taiga" - 5.6mm lightweight bolt-action target rifle (in 1959 it was awarded the silver medal of the VDNKh exhibition)
 SVD - 7.62mm semi-automatic sniper rifle
 PP-71 - 9mm submachine gun

References

External links
 http://www.kalashnikov.ru/upload/medialibrary/862/006_010.pdf
 http://vpk.name/news/36537_glavnoe_vpechatlenie__effektivnost_i_funkcionalnost.html
 https://www.youtube.com/watch?v=MhOtumSFP6w

1920 births
1991 deaths
People from Izhevsk
Firearm designers
Soviet engineers
Soviet inventors
Soviet military personnel of World War II